Chlorosplenium is a genus of fungi in the family Dermateaceae. The genus was circumscribed by Elias Magnus Fries in 1849.

Species
, the nomenclatural authority Index Fungorum accepts 17 species of Chlorosplenium:
Chlorosplenium atroviride Bres. 1906 
Chlorosplenium caesioluteum (Berk. & Broome) Dennis 1963 
Chlorosplenium cenangium (De Not.) Korf 1977 
Chlorosplenium chlora (Schwein.) M.A.Curtis 1856 
Chlorosplenium chlorophanum (M.Rousseau & De Not.) Boud. 1907 
Chlorosplenium foliaceum (Starbäck) Rick 1931 
Chlorosplenium fusisporum Liou & Z.C.Chen 1977 
Chlorosplenium hyperici-maculati Svrček 1992 
Chlorosplenium hypochlorum (Berk. & M.A. Curtis) J.R. Dixon 1974 
Chlorosplenium indicum Dumont, Korf & H. Singh 1974 
Chlorosplenium microspermum Henn. 1902 
Chlorosplenium olivaceum Rick 1931 
Chlorosplenium rodwayi Korf 1959 
Chlorosplenium rugipes (Peck) Korf 1959 
Chlorosplenium stemmatum (P.Karst.) P.Karst. 1873 
Chlorosplenium viride (Schwein.) Morgan 1902 
Chlorosplenium viridulum (Massee & Morgan) Dennis 1963

See also
List of Dermateaceae genera

References

Dermateaceae genera
Dermateaceae
Taxa named by Elias Magnus Fries
Taxa described in 1849